Conexibacter is a Gram-positive, non-spore-forming and aerobic genus of bacteria from the family Conexibacteraceae.

References

Further reading 
 
 
 

 

Actinomycetota
Bacteria genera